81 may refer to: 
 81 (number)
 one of the years 81 BC, AD 81, 1981, 2081
 Nickname for the Hells Angels Motorcycle Club. "H" is the eighth letter of the alphabet, and "A" is the first.

See also
 
 List of highways numbered